Eleocharis ovata, the ovate spikerush, is a species of annual grass in the family Cyperaceae (sedges). They have a self-supporting growth form and have simple, broad leaves and green flowers. Individuals can grow to 1.5 feet.

Sources

References 

ovata
Flora of Malta